Frank Arthur Lockett  (born June 1, 1957) is a former wide receiver in the National Football League.

High school

He played high school football at De Anza High School in Richmond, California.

Professional career
Lockett was drafted by the Green Bay Packers in the tenth round of the 1979 NFL Draft. He later played with the Miami Dolphins during the 1985 NFL season. Lockett also played with the Boston/New Orleans/Portland Breakers of the United States Football League in 1983 to 1985.

References

People from Independence, Louisiana
Miami Dolphins players
Boston/New Orleans/Portland Breakers players
American football wide receivers
Nebraska Cornhuskers football players
1957 births
Living people